The 2021 Minnesota Twins season  was the 61st season for the Minnesota Twins franchise in the Twin Cities of Minnesota, their 12th season at Target Field and the 121st overall in the American League. The Twins were favored to win the AL Central for the third straight season, and hopes were high that they would break their American sports-leading 18 straight postseason losses.  However, due to injuries to players such as superstar center fielder Byron Buxton, the Twins had a poor season, falling from first place in the AL Central the previous two seasons to last in 2021 with a 73–89 record and missing the postseason for the first time since 2018.

Regular season

Season standings

Records vs. AL Opponents

Game log

|- style="background:#fbb;"
| 1 || April 1 || @ Brewers || 5–6  || Hader (1–0) || Dobnak (0–1) || — || 11,740 || 0–1 || L1
|- style="background:#bfb;"
| 2 || April 3 || @ Brewers || 2–0 || Berríos (1–0) || Burnes (0–1) || Colomé (1) || 11,383 || 1–1 || W1
|- style="background:#bfb;"
| 3 || April 4 || @ Brewers || 8–2 || Pineda (1–0) || Houser (0–1) || — || 10,666 || 2–1 || W2
|- style="background:#bfb;"
| 4 || April 5 || @ Tigers || 15–6 || Shoemaker (1–0) || Ureña (0–1) || Dobnak (1) || 7,232 || 3–1 || W3
|- style="background:#fbb;"
| 5 || April 6 || @ Tigers || 3–4  || Soto (1–0) || Robles (0–1) || — || 7,306 || 3–2 || L1
|- style="background:#bfb;"
| 6 || April 7 || @ Tigers || 3–2 || Maeda (1–0) || Boyd (1–1) || Colomé (2) || 7,568 || 4–2 || W1
|- style="background:#bfb;"
| 7 || April 8 || Mariners || 10–2 || Berríos (2–0) || Gonzales (0–1) || — || 9,675 || 5–2 || W2
|- style="background:#fbb;"
| 8 || April 10 || Mariners || 3–4  || Graveman (1–0) || Rogers (0–1) || Middleton (1) || 9,817 || 5–3 || L1
|- style="background:#fbb;"
| 9 || April 11 || Mariners || 6–8 || Steckenrider (1–1) || Colomé (0–1) || Montero (2) || 9,792 || 5–4 || L2
|- style="background:#bbb;" 
| – || April 12 || Red Sox || colspan=7| Postponed (Protests due to Daunte Wright shooting; Makeup: April 14)
|- style="background:#fbb;"
| 10 || April 13 || Red Sox || 2–4 || Ottavino (1–0) || Dobnak (0–2) || Barnes (1) || 6,724 || 5–5 || L3
|- style="background:#fbb;"
| 11 || April 14  || Red Sox || 2–3  || Eovaldi (2–1) || Maeda (1–1) || Barnes (2) || rowspan=2|7,074 || 5–6 || L4
|- style="background:#fbb;"
| 12 || April 14  || Red Sox || 1–7  || Rodríguez (2–0) || Berríos (2–1) || — || 5–7 || L5
|- style="background:#bfb;"
| 13 || April 15 || Red Sox || 4–3 || Colomé (1–1) || Ottavino (1–1) || — || 7,925 || 6–7 || W1
|- style="background:#fbb;"
| 14 || April 16 || @ Angels || 3–10 || Slegers (1–0) || Dobnak (0–3) || — || 13,428 || 6–8 || L1
|- style="background:#bbb;"
| — || April 17 || @ Angels || colspan=7| Postponed (COVID-19; Makeup: May 20)
|- style="background:#bbb;"
| — || April 18 || @ Angels || colspan=7| Postponed (COVID-19; Makeup: May 20)
|- style="background:#bbb;"
| — || April 19 || @ Athletics || colspan=7| Postponed (COVID-19; Makeup: April 20)
|- style="background:#fbb;"
| 15 || April 20  || @ Athletics || 0–7  || Manaea (2–1) || Shoemaker (1–1) || — || rowspan=2|3,322 || 6–9 || L2
|- style="background:#fbb;"
| 16 || April 20  || @ Athletics || 0–1  || Luzardo (1–1) || Berríos (2–2) || Diekman (1) || 6–10 || L3
|- style="background:#fbb;"
| 17 || April 21 || @ Athletics || 12–13  || Guerra (1–0) || Colomé (1–2) || — || 3,405 || 6–11 || L4
|- style="background:#bfb;"
| 18 || April 23 || Pirates || 2–0 || Happ (1–0) || Brubaker (2–1) || Rogers (1) || 9,541 || 7–11 || W1
|- style="background:#fbb;"
| 19 || April 24 || Pirates || 2–6 || Cahill (1–2) || Pineda (1–1) || — || 9,718 || 7–12 || L1
|- style="background:#fbb;" 
| 20 || April 25 || Pirates || 2–6 || Holmes (1–0) || Shoemaker (1–2) || — || 9,396 || 7–13 || L2
|- style="background:#fbb;" 
| 21 || April 26 || @ Indians || 3–5  || Clase (2–1) || Colomé (1–3) || — || 4,555 || 7–14 || L3
|- style="background:#fbb;" 
| 22 || April 27 || @ Indians || 4–7 || Civale (4–0) || Maeda (1–2) || Karinchak (2) || 6,303 || 7–15 || L4
|- style="background:#bfb;" 
| 23 || April 28 || @ Indians || 10–2 || Happ (2–0) || Allen (1–4) || — || 5,903 || 8–15 || W1
|- style="background:#bfb;" 
| 24 || April 30 || Royals || 9–1 || Pineda (2–1) || Singer (1–3) || — || 9,982 || 9–15 || W2
|-

|- style="background:#fbb;" 
| 25 || May 1 || Royals || 3–11 || Duffy (4–1) || Shoemaker (1–3) || — || 9,993 || 9–16 || L1
|- style="background:#bfb;" 
| 26 || May 2 || Royals || 13–4 || Berríos (3–2) || Keller (2–3) || — || 9,997 || 10–16 || W1
|- style="background:#bfb;" 
| 27 || May 3 || Rangers || 6–5 || Maeda (2–2) || Dunning (1–2) || Rogers (2) || 8,071 || 11–16 || W2
|- style="background:#fbb;"
| 28 || May 4 || Rangers || 3–6  || Rodríguez (1–1) || Waddell (0–1) || Kennedy (8) || 8,022 || 11–17 || L1
|- style="background:#fbb;" 
| 29 || May 5 || Rangers || 1–3 || King (3–1) || Thorpe (0–1) || Kennedy (9) || 7,853 || 11–18 || L2
|- style="background:#fbb;" 
| 30 || May 6 || Rangers || 3–4  || Hearn (1–1) || Duffey (0–1) || Sborz (1) || 8,760 || 11–19 || L3
|- style="background:#bfb;" 
| 31 || May 7 || @ Tigers || 7–3 || Shoemaker (2–3) || Skubal (0–5) || — || 7,377 || 12–19 || W1
|- style="background:#fbb;" 
| 32 || May 8 || @ Tigers || 3–7 || Fulmer (2–2) || Duffey (0–2) || — || 8,000 || 12–20 || L1
|- style="background:#bbb;" 
| — || May 9 || @ Tigers || colspan=7 | Postponed (rain, makeup July 16)
|- style="background:#fbb;" 
| 33 || May 11 || @ White Sox || 3–9 || Crochet (1–2) || Alcalá (0–1) || — || 7,962 || 12–21 || L2
|- style="background:#fbb;" 
| 34 || May 12 || @ White Sox || 8–13 || Keuchel (2–1) || Happ (2–1) || — || 8,393 || 12–22 || L3
|- style="background:#fbb;" 
| 35 || May 13 || @ White Sox || 2–4 || Lynn (4–2) || Pineda (2–2) || Hendriks (7) || 8,188 || 12–23 || L4
|- style="background:#fbb;" 
| 36 || May 14 || Athletics || 1–6 || Montas (5–2) || Shoemaker (2–4) || — || 9,778 || 12–24 || L5
|- style="background:#bfb;" 
| 37 || May 15 || Athletics || 5–4 || Colomé (2–3) || Diekman (2–1) || Robles (1) || 12,212 || 13–24 || W1
|- style="background:#fbb;" 
| 38 || May 16 || Athletics || 6–7 || Trivino (2–1) || Rogers (0–2) || — || 10,270 || 13–25 || L1
|- style="background:#fbb;" 
| 39 || May 17 || White Sox || 4–16 || Keuchel (3–1) || Happ (2–2) || — || 8,431 || 13–26 || L2
|- style="background:#bfb;" 
| 40 || May 18 || White Sox || 5–4 || Rogers (1–2) || Bummer (0–2) || — || 9,504 || 14–26 || W1
|- style="background:#fbb;" 
| 41 || May 19 || White Sox || 1–2 || Giolito (3–4) || Shoemaker (2–5) || Hendriks (9) || 8,608 || 14–27 || L1
|- style="background:#fbb;"
| 42 || May 20  || @ Angels || 1–7  || Cobb (2–2) || Thorpe (0–2) || — || 9,920 || 14–28 || L2
|- style="background:#bfb;"
| 43 || May 20  || @ Angels || 6–3  || Berríos (4–2) || Canning (3–3) || Robles (2) || 9,820 || 15–28 || W1
|- style="background:#bfb;" 
| 44 || May 21 || @ Indians || 10–0 || Dobnak (1–3) || McKenzie (1–3) || — || 11,675 || 16–28 || W2
|- style="background:#fbb;" 
| 45 || May 22 || @ Indians || 3–5  || Karinchak (2–0) || Colomé (2–4) || — || 11,505 || 16–29 || L1
|- style="background:#bfb;" 
| 46 || May 23 || @ Indians || 8–5  || Robles (1–1) || Karinchak (2–1) || Duffey (1) || 9,805 || 17–29 || W1
|- style="background:#bfb;" 
| 47 || May 24 || Orioles || 8–3 || Alcalá (1–1) || Scott (2–3) || — || 8,530 || 18–29 || W2
|- style="background:#bfb;" 
| 48 || May 25 || Orioles || 7–4 || Berríos (5–2) || Kremer (0–5) || Rogers (3) || 9,969 || 19–29 || W3
|- style="background:#bfb;" 
| 49 || May 26 || Orioles || 3–2 || Pineda (3–2) || López (1–6) || Robles (3) || 10,574 || 20–29 || W4
|- style="background:#fbb;"
| 50 || May 28 || Royals || 3–8 || Bubic (1–0) || Dobnak (1–4) || — || 14,260 || 20–30 || L1
|- style="background:#bfb;" 
| 51 || May 29 || Royals || 6–5 || Happ (3–2) || Santana (0–1) || Rogers (4) || 18,444 || 21–30 || W1
|- style="background:#fbb;" 
| 52 || May 30 || Royals || 3–6 || Keller (5–4) || Shoemaker (2–6) || Holland (3) || 17,923 || 21–31 || L1
|- style="background:#bfb;" 
| 53 || May 31 || @ Orioles || 3–2  || Rogers (3–3) || Plutko (1–2) || Robles (4) || 11,010 || 22–31 || W1
|-

|- style="background:#fbb;" 
| 54 || June 1 || @ Orioles || 4–7 || Zimmermann (3–3) || Pineda (3–3) || Sulser (1) || 5,337 || 22–32 || L1
|- style="background:#fbb;" 
| 55 || June 2 || @ Orioles || 3–6 || Wells (1–0) || Dobnak (1–5) || — || 5,945 || 22–33 || L2
|- style="background:#fbb;" 
| 56 || June 3 || @ Royals || 5–6 || Junis (2–3) || Robles (1–2) || Barlow (2) || 11,072 || 22–34 || L3
|- style="background:#fbb;" 
| 57 || June 4 || @ Royals || 5–14 || Keller (6–4) || Shoemaker (2–7) || — || 22,612 || 22–35 || L4
|- style="background:#bfb;" 
| 58 || June 5 || @ Royals || 5–4 || Berríos (6–2) || Minor (4–3) || Robles (5) || 21,574 || 23–35 || W1
|- style="background:#bfb;" 
| 59 || June 6 || @ Royals || 2–1 || Farrell (1–0) || Singer (3–5) || Rogers (5) || 14,046 || 24–35 || W2
|- style="background:#fbb;" 
| 60 || June 8 || Yankees || 4–8 || Loáisiga (5–2) || Rogers (2–3) || — || 17,949 || 24–36 || L1
|- style="background:#fbb;" 
| 61 || June 9 || Yankees || 6–9 || Cole (7–3) || Dobnak (1–6) || — || 17,078 || 24–37 || L2
|- style="background:#bfb;" 
| 62 || June 10 || Yankees || 7–5 || Robles (2–2) || Chapman (4–1) || — || 17,728 || 25–37 || W1
|- style="background:#fbb;" 
| 63 || June 11 || Astros || 4–6 || Stanek (1–1) || Shoemaker (2–8) || Pressly (10) || 17,223 || 25–38 || L1
|- style="background:#bfb;" 
| 64 || June 12 || Astros || 5–2 || Berríos (6–2) || García (5–4) || Rogers (6) || 18,767 || 26–38 || W1
|- style="background:#fbb;" 
| 65 || June 13 || Astros || 3–14 || Valdez (3–0) || Pineda (3–4) || — || 19,147 || 26–39 || L1
|- style="background:#fbb;" 
| 66 || June 14 || @ Mariners || 3–4 || Sewald (3–2) || Robles (2–3) || Steckenrider (1) || 9,185 || 26–40 || L2
|- style="background:#fbb;" 
| 67 || June 15 || @ Mariners || 0–10 || Flexen (6–3) || Happ (3–3) || — || 7,669 || 26–41 || L3
|- style="background:#bfb;" 
| 68 || June 16 || @ Mariners || 7–2 || Thielbar (1–0) || Sheffield (5–6) || — || 8,098 || 27–41 || W1
|- style="background:#bfb;" 
| 69 || June 18 || @ Rangers || 7–5  || Robles (3–3) || Sborz (3–3) || Duffey (2) || 30,304 || 28–41 || W2
|- style="background:#bfb;" 
| 70 || June 19 || @ Rangers || 3–2 || Thielbar (2–0) || King (5–5) || Rogers (7) || 34,044 || 29–41 || W3
|- style="background:#bfb;" 
| 71 || June 20 || @ Rangers || 4–2 || Maeda (3–2) || Dunning (2–6) || Robles (6) || 34,007 || 30–41 || W4
|- style="background:#bfb;" 
| 72 || June 21 || Reds || 7–5  || Shoemaker (3–8) || Hembree (1–3) || — || 17,530 || 31–41 || W5
|- style="background:#fbb;" 
| 73 || June 22 || Reds || 7–10 || Antone (2–0) || Robles (3–4) || Garrett (4) || 19,187 || 31–42 || L1
|- style="background:#fbb;" 
| 74 || June 24 || Indians || 1–4 || Parker (1–0) || Alcalá (1–2) || Karinchak (9) || 18,812 || 31–43 || L2
|- style="background:#bfb;" 
| 75 || June 25 || Indians || 8–7 || Jax (1–0) || Wittgren (2–2) || Robles (7) || 16,892 || 32–43 || W1
|- style="background:#bbb;" 
| — || June 26 || Indians || colspan=7 | Postponed (rain, makeup September 14)
|- style="background:#bfb;" 
| 76 || June 27 || Indians || 8–2 || Happ (4–3) || Hentges (1–2) || — || 20,215 || 33–43 || W2
|- style="background:#bbb;" 
| — || June 28 || @ White Sox || colspan=7 | Postponed (rain, makeup July 19)
|- style="background:#fbb;" 
| 77 || June 29 || @ White Sox || 6–7 || Giolito (6–5) || Maeda (3–3) || Hendriks (21) || 17,382 || 33–44 || L1
|- style="background:#fbb;" 
| 78 || June 30 || @ White Sox || 3–13 || Cease (7–3) || Ober (0–1) || — || 16,803 || 33–45 || L2
|-

|- style="background:#fbb;" 
| 79 || July 1 || @ White Sox || 5–8 || Kopech (3–0) || Alcalá (1–3) || — || 29,944 || 33–46 || L3
|- style="background:#fbb;" 
| 80 || July 2 || @ Royals || 4–7 || Lovelady (1–0) || Happ (4–4) || Barlow (3) || 31,824 || 33–47 || L4
|- style="background:#fbb;"
| 81 || July 3 || @ Royals || 3–6 || Zimmer (4–0) || Jax (1–1) || Barlow (4) || 16,133 || 33–48 || L5
|- style="background:#bfb;" 
| 82 || July 4 || @ Royals || 6–2 || Maeda (4–3) || Keller (6–9) || — || 15,350 || 34–48 || W1
|- style="background:#bfb;" 
| 83 || July 5 || White Sox || 8–5 || Ober (1–1) || Cease (7–4) || Robles (8) || 20,321 || 35–48 || W2
|- style="background:#fbb;" 
| 84 || July 6 || White Sox || 1–4 || Rodón (7–3) || Berríos (7–3) || Hendriks (22) || 18,437 || 35–49 || L1
|- style="background:#fbb;" 
| 85 || July 7 || White Sox || 1–6 || Lynn (9–3) || Pineda (3–5) || — || 19,664 || 35–50 || L2
|- style="background:#bfb;"
| 86 || July 8 || Tigers || 5–3 || Happ (5–4) || Skubal (5–8) || Rogers (8) || 18,192 || 36–50 || W1
|- style="background:#bfb;"
| 87 || July 9 || Tigers || 4–2 || Alcalá (2–3) || Manning (1–3) || Robles (9) || 21,725 || 37–50 || W2
|- style="background:#bfb;" 
| 88 || July 10 || Tigers || 9–4 || Coulombe (1–0) || Jiménez (2–1) || — || 21,030 || 38–50 || W3
|- style="background:#bfb;"
| 89 || July 11 || Tigers || 12–9  || Duffey (1–2) || Holland (1–2) || — || 20,744 || 39–50 || W4
|-style=background:#bbbfff
||-|| July 13 || colspan="8"|91st All-Star Game in Denver, CO
|- style="background:#bbb;" 
| — || July 16  || @ Tigers || colspan=7 | Postponed (rain, makeup July 17)
|- style="background:#bbb;" 
| — || July 16  || @ Tigers || colspan=7 | Postponed (rain, makeup August 30)
|- style="background:#fbb;" 
| 90 || July 17  || @ Tigers || 0–1  || Norris (1–3) || Barnes (0–1) || Soto (8) || 13,747 || 39–51 || L1
|- style="background:#fbb;" 
| 91 || July 17  || @ Tigers || 4–5  || Jiménez (3–1) || Rogers (2–4) || — || 31,624 || 39–52 || L2
|- style="background:#fbb;" 
| 92 || July 18 || @ Tigers || 0–7 || Peralta (3–1) || Happ (5–5) || — || 15,854 || 39–53 || L3
|- style="background:#bfb;" 
| 93 || July 19  || @ White Sox || 3–2  || Duffey (2–2) || Crochet (2–5) || Robles (10) || N/A || 40–53 || W1
|- style="background:#fbb;" 
| 94 || July 19  || @ White Sox || 3–5  || Bummer (2–4) || Berríos (7–4) || — || 18,272 || 40–54 || L1
|- style="background:#fbb;" 
| 95 || July 20 || @ White Sox || 5–9 || Burr (2–0) || Alcalá (2–4) || — || 17,703 || 40–55 || L2
|- style="background:#bfb;" 
| 96 || July 21 || @ White Sox || 7–2 || Pineda (4–5) || Cease (7–6) || — || 25,600 || 41–55 || W1
|- style="background:#fbb;" 
| 97 || July 22 || Angels || 2–3 || Heaney (6–7) || Maeda (4–4) || Iglesias (20) || 23,337 || 41–56 || L1
|- style="background:#bfb;" 
| 98 || July 23 || Angels || 5–4 || Minaya (1–0) || Iglesias (6–4) || Rogers (9) || 21,384 || 42–56 || W1
|- style="background:#fbb;" 
| 99 || July 24 || Angels || 1–2 || Sandoval (3–4) || Berríos (7–5) || Iglesias (21) || 22,240 || 42–57 || L1
|- style="background:#fbb;" 
| 100 || July 25 || Angels || 2–6 || Barría (1–0) || Coulombe (1–1) || — || 23,158 || 42–58 || L2
|- style="background:#bfb;" 
| 101 || July 26 || Tigers || 6–5  || Thielbar (3–0) || Soto (4–2) || — || 17,713 || 43–58 || W1
|- style="background:#fbb;" 
| 102 || July 27 || Tigers || 5–6  || Cisnero (2–4) || Alcalá (2–5) || Norris (1) || 17,643 || 43–59 || L1
|- style="background:#fbb;" 
| 103 || July 28 || Tigers || 14–17 || Holland (2–2) || Happ (5–6) || — || 17,817 || 43–60 || L2
|- style="background:#fbb;" 
| 104 || July 30 || @ Cardinals || 1–5 || Helsley (6–4) || Duffey (2–3) || — || 34,036 || 43–61 || L3
|- style="background:#bfb;" 
| 105 || July 31 || @ Cardinals || 8–1 || Alcalá (3–5) || Woodford (2–3) || — || 33,432 || 44–61 || W1
|-

|- style="background:#fbb;" 
| 106 || August 1 || @ Cardinals || 3–7 || Wainwright (9–6) || Pineda (4–6) || — || 28,975 || 44–62 || L1
|- style="background:#bfb;" 
| 107 || August 3 || @ Reds || 7–5 || Coulombe (2–1) || Hembree (2–6) || Colomé (3) || 18,396 || 45–62 || W1
|- style="background:#fbb;"
| 108 || August 4 || @ Reds || 5–6 || Castillo (6–10) || Barnes (0–2) || Lorenzen (1) || 16,828 || 45–63 || L1
|- style="background:#bfb;" 
| 109 || August 5 || @ Astros || 5–3 || Jax (2–1) || Valdez (7–3) || Colomé (4) || 26,208 || 46–63 || W1
|- style="background:#bfb;" 
| 110 || August 6 || @ Astros || 5–4  || Minaya (2–0) || Montero (5–4) || — || 29,631 || 47–63 || W2
|- style="background:#fbb;" 
| 111 || August 7 || @ Astros || 0–4 || García (8–6) || Pineda (4–7) || — || 29,647 || 47–64 || L1
|- style="background:#bfb;" 
| 112 || August 8 || @ Astros || 7–5 || Maeda (5–4) || McCullers Jr. (9–3) || Colomé (5) || 26,825 || 48–64 || W1
|- style="background:#fbb;" 
| 113 || August 9 || White Sox || 1–11 || Giolito (9–8) || Burrows (0–1) || — || 17,858 || 48–65 || L1
|- style="background:#bfb;" 
| 114 || August 10 || White Sox || 4–3 || Jax (3–1) || Keuchel (7–6) || Colomé (6) || 18,302 || 49–65 || W1
|- style="background:#bfb;" 
| 115 || August 11 || White Sox || 1–0 || Thielbar (4–0) || Ruiz (1–2) || Colomé (7) || 22,370 || 50–65 || W2
|- style="background:#fbb;" 
| 116 || August 13 || Rays || 4–10 || McClanahan (7–4) || Pineda (4–8) || Phillips (1) || 23,125 || 50–66 || L1
|- style="background:#bfb;" 
| 117 || August 14 || Rays || 12–0 || Maeda (6–4) || Wacha (2–4) || — || 21,034 || 51–66 || W1
|- style="background:#bfb;" 
| 118 || August 15 || Rays || 5–4 || Colomé (3–4) || Wisler (3–5) || — || 22,467 || 52–66 || W2
|- style="background:#bfb;" 
| 119 || August 16 || Indians || 5–4  || Thielbar (5–0) || Wittgren (2–6) || — || 15,622 || 53–66 || W3
|- style="background:#fbb;" 
| 120 || August 17 || Indians || 1–3 || Morgan (2–5) || Ober (1–2) || Clase (17) || 19,605 || 53–67 || L1
|- style="background:#bfb;" 
| 121 || August 18 || Indians || 8–7  || Coulombe (3–1) || Garza (2–1) || — || 19,949 || 54–67 || W1
|- style="background:#fbb;" 
| 122 || August 19 || @ Yankees || 5–7 || Taillon (8–4) || Gant (4–7) || Green (6) || 30,019 || 54–68 || L1
|- style="background:#fbb;"  
| 123 || August 20 || @ Yankees || 2–10 || Cortés Jr. (2–1) || Barnes (0–3) || — || 39,124 || 54–69 || L2
|- style="background:#fbb;" 
| 124 || August 21 || @ Yankees || 1–7 || Cole (12–6) || Maeda (6–5) || — || 35,247 || 54–70 || L3
|- style="background:#bbb;" 
| — || August 22 || @ Yankees || colspan=7 | Postponed (rain, makeup September 13)
|- style="background:#fbb;" 
| 125 || August 24 || @ Red Sox || 9–11 || Taylor (1–0) || Jax (3–2) || Robles (11) || 27,986 || 54–71 || L4
|- style="background:#bfb;"
| 126 || August 25 || @ Red Sox || 9–6  || Colomé (4–4) || Robles (3–5) || — || 28,923 || 55–71 || W1
|- style="background:#fbb;"
| 127 || August 26 || @ Red Sox || 2–12 || Sale (3–0) || Gant (4–8) || — || 33,746 || 55–72 || L1
|- style="background:#bfb;"
| 128 || August 27 || Brewers || 2–0 || Albers (1–0)|| Lauer (4–5) || Colomé (8) || 20,280 || 56–72 || W1
|- style="background:#bfb;" 
| 129 || August 28 || Brewers || 6–4 || Thielbar (6–0) || Houser (7–6) || Colomé (9) || 29,342 || 57–72 || W2
|- style="background:#fbb;" 
| 130 || August 29 || Brewers || 2–6 || Ashby (1–0) || Jax (3–3) || — || 26,186 || 57–73 || L1
|- style="background:#bfb;" 
| 131 || August 30 || @ Tigers || 3–2 || Ober (2–2) || Mize (7–7) || Colomé (10) || 13,425 || 58–73 || W1
|- style="background:#fbb;" 
| 132 || August 31 || Cubs || 1–3 || Rodríguez (3–2) || Gant (4–9) || Wick (1) || 22,224 || 58–74 || L1
|-

|- style="background:#fbb;" 
| 133 || September 1 || Cubs || 0–3 || Steele (3–2) || Ryan (0–1) || Alzolay (1) || 21,784 || 58–75 || L2
|- style="background:#fbb;" 
| 134 || September 3 || @ Rays || 3–5 || Wacha (3–4) || Dobnak (1–7) || Kittredge (6) || 8,864 || 58–76 || L3
|- style="background:#fbb;" 
| 135 || September 4 || @ Rays || 4–11 || Archer (1–1) || Albers (1–1) || Enns (1) || 13,861 || 58–77 || L4
|- style="background:#bfb;" 
| 136 || September 5 || @ Rays || 6–5 || Duffey (3–3) || Kittredge (8–3) || Colomé (11) || 14,165 || 59–77 || W1
|- style="background:#bfb;" 
| 137 || September 6 || @ Indians || 5–2 || Pineda (5–8) || Allen (1–6) || Colomé (12) || 12,675 || 60–77 || W2
|- style="background:#bfb;" 
| 138 || September 7 || @ Indians || 3–0 || Gant (5–9) || Civale (10–3) || Colomé (13) || 10,448 || 61–77 || W3
|- style="background:#bfb;" 
| 139 || September 8 || @ Indians || 3–0 || Ryan (1–1) || McKenzie (4–6) || Duffey (3) || 11,037 || 62–77 || W4
|- style="background:#fbb;" 
| 140 || September 9 || @ Indians || 1–4 || Quantrill (5–3) || Albers (1–2) || Clase (22) || 11,846 || 62–78 || L1
|- style="background:#fbb;" 
| 141 || September 10 || Royals || 4–6  || Santana (2–2) || Minaya (2–1) || Holland (8) || 20,803 || 62–79 || L2
|- style="background:#bfb;" 
| 142 || September 11 || Royals || 9–2 || Pineda (6–8) || Singer (4–10) || — || 19,532 || 63–79 || W1
|- style="background:#fbb;" 
| 143 || September 12 || Royals || 3–5 || Brentz (4–2) || Alcalá (3–6) || Barlow (12) || 19,496 || 63–80 || L1
|- style="background:#fbb;" 
| 144 || September 13 || @ Yankees || 5–6  || Holmes (8−3) || Garza Jr. (1−3) || — || 31,528 || 63–81 || L2
|- style="background:#fbb;" 
| 145 || September 14  || Indians || 1–3  || McKenzie (5–6) || Coulombe (3–2) || Clase (23) || 15,319 || 63–82 || L3
|- style="background:#bfb;" 
| 146 || September 14  || Indians || 6–3  || Barraclough (1–0) || Allen (1–7) || Colomé (14) || 18,905 || 64–82 || W1
|- style="background:#fbb;" 
| 147 || September 15 || Indians || 3–12 || Quantrill (6–3) || Jax (3–4) || — || 14,222 || 64–83 || L1
|- style="background:#bfb;" 
| 148 || September 17 || @ Blue Jays || 7–3 || Pineda (7–8) || Ryu (13–9) || — || 14,798 || 65–83 || W1
|- style="background:#fbb;" 
| 149 || September 18 || @ Blue Jays || 2–6 || Matz (13–7) || Ober (2–3) || — || 14,722 || 65–84 || L1
|- style="background:#fbb;" 
| 150 || September 19 || @ Blue Jays || 3–5 || Berríos (12–8) || Farrell (1–1) || Romano (19) || 14,601 || 65–85 || L2
|- style="background:#bfb;" 
| 151 || September 21 || @ Cubs || 9–5 || Barraclough (2–0) || Mills (6–7) || — || 25,594 || 66–85 || W1
|- style="background:#bfb;"
| 152 || September 22 || @ Cubs || 5–4 || Ryan (2–1) || Hendricks (14–7) || Colomé (15) || 24,402 || 67–85 || W2
|- style="background:#bfb;" 
| 153 || September 23 || Blue Jays || 7–2 || Pineda (8–8) || Hatch (0–1) || Garza Jr. (1) || 15,509 || 68–85 || W3
|- style="background:#bfb;" 
| 154 || September 24 || Blue Jays || 3–1 || Ober (3–3) || Berríos (12–9) || Colomé (16) || 18,861 || 69–85 || W4
|- style="background:#fbb;" 
| 155 || September 25 || Blue Jays || 1–6 || Ray (13–6) || Gant (5–10) || — || 27,183 || 69–86 || L1
|- style="background:#fbb;" 
| 156 || September 26 || Blue Jays || 2–5 || Manoah (8–2) || Jax (3–5) || Romano (21) || 20,676 || 69–87 || L2
|- style="background:#bfb;" 
| 157 || September 28 || Tigers || 3–2 || Thielbar (7–0) || Alexander (2–4) || Colomé (17) || 16,329 || 70–87 || W1
|- style="background:#bfb;" 
| 158 || September 29 || Tigers || 5–2 || Pineda (9–8) || Mize (7–9) || — || 17,254 || 71–87 || W2
|- style="background:#fbb;" 
| 159 || September 30 || Tigers || 7–10 || Lange (1–3) || Garza Jr. (1–4) || Fulmer (13) || 21,186 || 71–88 || L1
|-

|- style="background:#fbb;" 
| 160 || October 1 || @ Royals || 6–11 || Heasley (1–1) || Gant (5–11) || — || 14,293 || 71–89 || L2
|- style="background:#bfb;" 
| 161 || October 2 || @ Royals || 4–0 || Jax (4–5) || Bubic (6–7) || — || 22,321 || 72–89 || W1
|- style="background:#bfb;" 
| 162 || October 3 || @ Royals || 7–3 || Vincent (1–0) || Kowar (0–6) || Alcalá (1) || 17,158 || 73–89 || W2
|-

Player stats

Batting
Note: G = Games played; AB = At bats; R = Runs scored; H = Hits; 2B = Doubles; 3B = Triples; HR = Home runs; RBI = Runs batted in; AVG = Batting average; SB = Stolen bases

Pitching
Note: W = Wins; L = Losses; ERA = Earned run average; G = Games pitched; GS = Games started; SV = Saves; IP = Innings pitched; R = Total runs allowed; ER = Earned runs allowed; BB = Walks allowed; K = Strikeouts

Roster

Farm system

References

External links
2021 Minnesota Twins season at Baseball Reference

2021
2021 Major League Baseball season
2021 in sports in Minnesota